Eradu Kanasu (English: Two Dreams) is a Kannada film directed by Madan, it stars Vijay Raghavendra and Karunya Ram.

Erasu Kanasu Dubbed In Hindi As Ab Insaaf Hoga By Pen Movies.

Cast
Vijay Raghavendra
Karunya Ram
Krishi Tapanda
Petrol Prasanna
Kuri Pratap

Production
The film began production in September 2015 with Vijay Raghavendra announcing that he would act in a project directed by Madan with the title named after 1974 film of same name. Coincidentally S. K. Bhagawan, director of that film clapped the first shot during the launch at KAnteerava Studios.

Soundtrack

Music was composed by Steve-Kaushik and released on Ashwini Media Networks.

References

External links
 

2017 films
2017 action drama films
2017 romantic drama films
2010s Kannada-language films
Indian action drama films
Indian romantic drama films
2017 masala films
2017 directorial debut films